The Ghost is a Pakistani television series based on a foreign novel, adapted by Umera Ahmed and directed by Babar Javed. It is produced by Momina Duraid under banner Moomal Entertainment. The leading cast of the series comprises Faysal Quraishi, Nadia Jamil, Sania Saeed, Samina Peerzada and Savera Nadeem.

Reception
A reviewer from Masala.in said it as highly female-oriented show and listed in some underrated shows.

Plot 
The plot revolves around a successful businessesman who has provided his wife with every luxury except attention and time. Due to this, the wife divorces him and he then sets out to go away from this broken relation and its memories. He goes to England where he finds his way through life after intercations with the women, he encountered there.

Cast 

 Faysal Quraishi
 Sania Saeed
 Nadia Jamil
 Samina Peerzada
 Savera Nadeem
 Asif Raza Mir
 Rehan Sheikh
 Badar Khalil

Awards and nominations 

 9th Lux Style Awards - Sania Saeed won Lux Style Award for Best Television Actress (Satellite)

References

Pakistani television series